Phillyrin is an endophytic fungal isolate with anti-obesity activity. It can be produced by Colletotrichum gloeosporioides, an endophytic fungus isolated from Forsythia suspensa. It can also be prepared directly from Forsythia suspensa.

Notes 

 Preparative isolation and purification of phillyrin from the medicinal plant Forsythia suspensa by high-speed counter-current chromatography
HB Li, F Chen - Journal of Chromatography A, 2005. 
 Ultrasound-assisted extraction of phillyrin from Forsythia suspensa. EQ Xia, XX Ai, SY Zang, TT Guan, XR Xu, HB Li - Ultrasonics Sonochemistry, 2011

Lignan glucosides
Colletotrichum
Oxygen heterocycles
Methoxy compounds
]